June Sapiel is a Penobscot Nation member and activist from Maine. Sapiel was born and raised on the Penobscot Indian Island Reservation, also known as "Indian Island" and was the niece of John "Sam" Sapiel who was a well-known Indigenous activist before his passing in 2017.

Sapiel focuses most of her activism work on Indigenous rights, land and water rights and women's rights. June Sapiel has been a speaker at the 2018 National Day of Mourning (United States protest), the 2017 Augusta 2017 Women's March at the Maine State House, and other various events. Sapiel was a member of and speaker for the Dakota Access Pipeline protests. She also protests to change Columbus Day to Indigenous Peoples' Day.

Dakota Access Pipeline 
On September 17, 2016 Sapiel was a speaker at a protest in Portland's Congress Square Park against the Dakota Access Pipeline that brought together Penobscot Nation members and climate activists. The protest was aimed to call on President Obama to reject a $3.8 billion proposed pipeline in South Dakota.

On October 28, 2016 Sapiel's son, David Demo, was arrested for protesting the oil pipeline in North Dakota. In an interview she addressed the ongoing battle between the water rights with the state of Maine and the Penobscot people. Sapiel and other Penobscot Nation members in addition to the Bangor Social and Economic Justice Coalition prepared a candlelight vigil in Bangor, Maine as well as Portland, Maine to "stand in solidarity."

In January 2017 Sapiel helped organized a protest in Bangor, Maine outside of TD Bank demanding they withdraw funding from the Dakota Access Pipeline. Other organizations also encouraged community members to divest from TD Bank to "standing in solidarity." Sapiel also traveled several times to North Dakota to join the protests, and spoke to the press from Standing Rock in February 2017.

Indigenous Peoples Day 
In addition to protesting the Dakota Access Pipeline June Sapiel has also represented Penobscot Nation to discuss replacing Columbus Day with Indigenous Peoples Day. She attended a forum with Orono, Maine councilors to express the opinion of the Penobscot people in regards to the name change. Orono town councilors voted 6-0 in favor of changing the name in the town. In March 2019 the Maine House voted to change Columbus Day to Indigenous People's Day statewide and is on the agenda to vote in the senate.

External links 
 Women's March 2017 - Augusta, Maine
 Oh Freedom! Podcast - February, 2017
 Sapiel on The Beacon podcast
 Women's March 2018 - Augusta, Maine

References 

Living people
Penobscot people
Native Americans' rights activists
21st-century Native Americans
Female Native American leaders
People from Penobscot Indian Island Reservation
Native American people from Maine
Year of birth missing (living people)
21st-century Native American women